Josiah Fisk (September 8, 1781 in Haverhill, Grafton County, New Hampshire – August 10, 1844 in Keeseville, Clinton County, New York) was an American politician from New York.

Life
He was the son of Amos Fisk and Mary (Wheeler) Fisk. In 1806, he married Phebe Peters (1785–1860), and they had seven children.

He was a member of the New York State Assembly (Clinton Co.) in 1825 and 1826.

He was a member of the New York State Senate (4th D.) from 1832 to 1835, sitting in the 55th, 56th, 57th and 58th New York State Legislatures.

He was President of the Temperance Society of Keeseville.

He was buried at the Keeseville Old Cemetery in Au Sable, New York.

Sources
The New York Civil List compiled by Franklin Benjamin Hough (pages 129f, 140, 202f and 273; Weed, Parsons and Co., 1858)

External links

1781 births
1844 deaths
People from Haverhill, New Hampshire
People from Keeseville, New York
New York (state) state senators
Members of the New York State Assembly
New York (state) Jacksonians
19th-century American politicians
People from Grafton County, New Hampshire